Daniel Carter or Dan Carter may refer to:

Music
 Daniel Carter (musician) (born 1945), American jazz musician active in New York City
 Daniel P. Carter (born 1972), bassist with A
 Daniel Carter (LDS composer) (born 1955), American composer in The Church of Jesus Christ of Latter-day Saints

Other
 Dan Carter (born 1982), New Zealand rugby union player
 Dan Carter (American politician) (born 1967), politician from Connecticut
 Dan Carter (Canadian politician), mayor of Oshawa, Ontario
 Dan T. Carter, American historian
 Daniel Carter (comics), one of three characters with the identity of Supernova in the DC Comics Universe
 Daniel Carter Beard (1850–1941), American illustrator and author
 Dan Carter, protagonist of the Dan Carter Cub Scout  series by Mildred Wirt Benson

See also
 Danielle Carter (disambiguation)